Schneps Media  is a 1985-founded media company "that began with The Queens Courier." They own and operate both print and online news services. The New York Times wrote in 2019 that Schneps publishes "more than 50 newspapers and magazines."

They also have a unit named Schneps Media Events

History
Their scoops are picked up by The New York Times. In 2019 they acquired AM New York Metro from Newsday Media Group.

By early 2020 they had expanded their reach to Philadelphia.

Controversies
The Gothamist wrote "The company also publishes a promotional "newspaper" for Brooklyn Borough President Eric Adams, full of glowing stories about the borough president," sourcing it to a Schneps competitor, The New York Daily News. Gothamist also claimed, regarding Schneps reporters, that "the Schneps owners forced them to write sponsored content, while shielding advertisers and local officials from critical coverage."

Publications
Publications include:
AM New York Metro
Bronx Times-Reporter
The Brooklyn Paper
 Dan's Papers
 Gay City News
 The Independent (East Hampton)
 Metro (Philadelphia)
TimesLedger Newspapers
The Villager

References

External links
 official website

Online magazines published in the United States
Newspapers published in New York City
Weekly newspapers published in the United States